Pavel Kantor (born 17 August 1991) is a Czech professional ice hockey goaltender. He is currently playing for HC Nové Zámky of the Slovak Extraliga.

Kantor previously spent a short stint in 2019 with Elite Ice Hockey League (EIHL) side Sheffield Steelers. Kantor also previously iced for BK Mlada Boleslav of the Czech Extraliga.

Kantor made his Czech Extraliga debut playing with Motor České Budějovice during the 2011-12 Czech Extraliga season.

References

External links

1991 births
Living people
Czech ice hockey goaltenders
SK Horácká Slavia Třebíč players
Motor České Budějovice players
LHK Jestřábi Prostějov players
HC Oceláři Třinec players
Sportspeople from České Budějovice
IHC Písek players
Sportovní Klub Kadaň players
Stadion Hradec Králové players
HC Vítkovice players
Sheffield Steelers players
HC Dynamo Pardubice players
HC Nové Zámky players
Czech expatriate ice hockey players in Slovakia
Czech expatriate sportspeople in England
Czech expatriate sportspeople in Norway
Expatriate ice hockey players in Norway
Expatriate ice hockey players in England